The 2001 Bangladesh–India border clashes were a series of armed skirmishes between India and Bangladesh in April 2001. The clashes took place between troops of the Bangladesh Rifles (BDR) and the Indian Border Security Force (BSF) on the poorly-marked international border between the two countries.

Background 
The Partition of Bengal in 1947 left a poorly demarcated international border between the states of India and Bangladesh (erstwhile East Pakistan). Ownership of several villages on both sides of the de facto border were disputed and claimed by both countries. The dispute over the demarcation of the India–Bangladesh border worsened due to the existence of over 190 enclaves.

Cause 
One of the disputed areas was a small sliver of land near the village of Padua (also known as Pyrdiwah), on the border between Bangladesh and the Indian state of Meghalaya, which was used by Indian security forces during the 1971 Bangladesh Liberation War to train ethnic Bengali guerrillas known as the Mukti Bahini, who were fighting the Pakistan Army and pro-Pakistan loyalist militias. Following its independence, Bangladesh staked its claim to the area in which India's Border Security Force (BSF) had established a post in since 1971. The village is one of the Indian exclaves on the border between Bangladesh and Meghalaya. There were 111 Indian enclaves in Bangladeshi-claimed territory and 50 Bangladeshi enclaves in Indian-claimed territory. Padua village is an adverse possession—a village inhabited by Indians that is legally owned by Bangladesh (until the border agreement is ratified and the populations exchanged). The people of this village are ethnic Khasis.

Conflict 
The fighting that took place during these clashes was the worst since Bangladesh's war with Pakistan in 1971. It took place around the village of Padua in the Indian state of Meghalaya which adjoins the Tamabil area of the Bangladeshi border in the Sylhet district.

On 16 April 2001, a force of around 1000 Bangladeshi soldiers attacked and captured Padua village, breaking the status quo and forcing the civilians there to flee. Bangladesh claimed that the village had been illegally occupied by India since Bangladesh's war of independence in 1971. The Indian Border Security Force (BSF) post in Padua village was surrounded, trapping several BSF troops within. However, both sides held their fire and began negotiations. Over the course of the following days, about three BSF companies proceeded to reinforce the outpost. This incident was resolved later without any bloodshed.

Following this standoff, BSF troops along the Indian–Bangladeshi border were put on high alert and ordered to begin intensive patrolling. Unlike the latter village, which is an adverse possession, Boroibari is an area lying across a fence well inside Bangladesh. The intrusion was used as a "counter-attack" by India to retaliate after the earlier incident in Padua. According to Bangladeshi sources, Indian forces launched an early-morning attack on their posts in the frontier district of Kurigram, which lies on the border with the Indian state of Assam.

Immediately upon entering Bangladeshi territory the 16 Indian paramilitary personnel were ambushed and killed by Bangladeshi soldiers, who were assisted by hundreds of villagers. Following their capture, the Indian soldiers were allegedly tortured by Bangladeshi security forces before being executed. General Gurbachan Jagat of the Indian BSF claimed that the returned bodies showed signs of serious mutilation, including strangulation, broken bones, as well as evidence of charring and scalding. Around midnight, the Foreign Secretary of India, Chokila Iyer, received a call from her Bangladeshi counterpart, Syed Muazzem Ali, saying that orders had been issued to restore the status quo as well as for an immediate Bangladeshi withdrawal from Padua. The Bangladesh Rifles (BDR) withdrew from Padua by the night of 19 April.

In the confrontation, 16 Indian border guards were killed while two suffered injuries. The attack also left three Bangladeshi border guards dead and another five wounded. About 10,000 civilians fled the area after some 24 were wounded in the cross-border clashes.

After the Boroibari intrusion on 18 April, India alleged that the BDR started firing 3-inch and 8-inch mortar shells on Mancachar village, which is another disputed Indian enclave.

Result 

After both governments intervened in the situation, the Bangladeshis and Indians returned to their original positions and restored the previous status quo. Fresh clashes erupted along the India–Bangladesh border just hours after both sides voiced regret and concern over the recent killings, but by midnight on 20 April, cross-border firing had stopped. An article reported that 6,000 Indian civilians had fled the region, and Indian government officials were attempting to convince the displaced villagers to return to their homes.
Bangladesh later agreed to return the bodies of 16 Indian soldiers the next day. Upon examining the bodies of the dead personnel, India accused Bangladeshi forces of subjecting the captives to severe torture before they were shot dead. On the other hand, three Bangladeshi soldiers were also killed; two during combat and another who died of wounds that were sustained during cross-border operations.

Observers have termed the incident as a political ploy to rouse nationalistic passions before the Bangladeshi elections (which were 2 months away at the time of the incident) and as malicious adventurism by the Bangladesh Rifles (BDR). The Government of Bangladesh denied allegations that it had supported the BDR's initialization of hostilities with India and termed the incident as the "adventurism of its local commanders".

Aftermath 
The Prime Minister of Bangladesh Sheikh Hasina and Prime Minister of India Atal Bihari Vajpayee engaged in telephonic discussions and subsequently agreed to order a high-level investigation into the incident. Indian Foreign Ministry spokesman Raminder Jassal reported that both India and Bangladesh would improve bilateral diplomatic channels and promised to exercise restraint in the future. India and Bangladesh initiated talks to resolve their border disputes in March 2002. By July 2002, the two sides established joint-working groups to agree on and establish the non-demarcated sections of the border.

Bangladesh ordered no courts-martial, suspensions, or transfers of any local military commanders. This was the first armed engagement between India and Bangladesh, two neighbouring states that had otherwise maintained friendly relations since Bangladesh's independence from Pakistan in 1971. The end of the brief conflict saw an upsurge of nationalism in Bangladesh. In parliamentary elections, the four-party right-wing alliance led by the Bangladesh Nationalist Party and Jamaat-e-Islami Bangladesh won a majority of 196 seats out of 300.

Both sides desisted from any further hostilities and began border talks to discuss disputes along their  border. The two states experienced a thaw in their diplomatic relations shortly afterwards.
India has since then initiated the construction of a barrier along the entire length of its international border with Bangladesh, and is still in the process of constructing it. Bangladesh has protested the construction of the barrier, claiming that the construction of a fence within 150 yards of the international border was a gross violation of the Indo-Bangladeshi Treaty of Friendship, Cooperation and Peace. The Bangladeshi government also protested the alleged frequent Indian Border Security Force (BSF) incursions into Bangladesh, and cross-border firing that has resulted in the deaths of Bangladeshis inside Bangladeshi territory. In a news conference in August 2008, it was stated that 97 people had been killed (69 Bangladeshis, 28 Indians; rest unidentified) while trying to cross the border illegally in the prior six months.

See also
 Deaths along the Bangladesh–India border
 Bangladesh–India relations
 Bangladesh–India border

References

Further reading
 Gautam Das (2007)."Chapter 17—Operation Gone Sour: Pyrdiwah and Boroibari, 2001". Unlearned Lessons: An Appraisal of India's Military Mishaps. Har Anand Publications. 

Indian-Bangladeshi Border Conflict, 2001
Indian-Bangladeshi Border Conflict, 2001
Bangladesh–India border
Territorial disputes of India
Territorial disputes of Bangladesh
Battles in 2001